The Royal National Mòd is an Eisteddfod-inspired international Celtic festival focusing upon Scottish Gaelic literature, traditional music, and culture which is held annually in Scotland. It is the largest of several major Scottish Mòds and is often referred to simply as the Mòd.

The Mòd is run by An Comunn Gàidhealach (The Gaelic Association) and includes competitions and awards.

History
The Mòd was founded by An Comunn Gàidhealach. St Columba's Church, Glasgow, also greatly influenced the Mòd's inception when, in 1891, its choir was invited to give a Gaelic Concert in Oban, presided over by Lord Archibald Campbell.  The concert was attended by much of the Scottish nobility, including Louise, Princess Royal and Duchess of Fife.  After the concert, the choir were entertained to supper at the Alexandra Hotel, and a description of the entertainment is given in one of William Black's novels.  This concert was the prelude to the first Mòd, which was held at Oban the following year and St. Columba Choir won the award in the Choral music competition.

The Mòd has been held most years in October since 1892.  The only years in which the National Mòd was not held were the war years of 1914-1919 and 1939–1946, and the pandemic year of 2020.  The "Royal" was not originally part of the name.  It is still the practice of the St Columba's Church to send a concert party to start off the fund-raising when the Mòd visits Oban.  As well as winning the premier choir competition for the first three years, the congregation has also had many Mòd gold medallists over the years.

The Mòd itself has been greatly influenced by the National Eisteddfod of Wales, although it tends to be somewhat more restrained in its ceremonial aspects.

A watershed moment took place during the 2011 Royal National Mòd at Stornoway, when the poetry of Lewis MacKinnon, composed in the Canadian Gaelic dialect spoken in Antigonish County, Nova Scotia, won the Bardic Crown. It was the first time in the history of the Mòd that such an award had been granted to a non-Scot.

Competitions
The Mòd largely takes the form of formal competitions.  Choral events and traditional music including Gaelic song, fiddle, bagpipe, clarsach and folk groups dominate. Spoken word events include children's and adults' poetry reading, storytelling and Bible reading, and categories such as Ancient Folk Tale or Humorous Monologue.  Children can also present an original drama, and there are competitions in written literature.  The Mòd also runs an annual shinty competition, the Mòd Cup, between the two shinty teams closest to where the Mòd is taking place.

The winners of each day's competitions are invited to perform in the winners' cèilidhs held every evening.

The Mòd is a celebration of [Scottish] Gaelic language and culture, which raises its profile and contributes towards the aim of securing its future.

Improvements in the provision of Gaelic-medium education across Scotland have meant that by 2007 the junior fluent speakers' section had increased to such an extent that the organisers were forced to extend some of the competitions beyond one day.

There has been some criticism of the prominence of the "Gold Medal" event of operatic-style singing, which some Gaelic musicians feel marginalises more traditional singing styles.

Culturally, the Mòd is comparable to the Welsh Eisteddfod and the Irish Oireachtas na Gaeilge.

The Mòd Fringe

The Mòd draws a large crowd, which leads local venues to put on various events in addition to the official Mòd events.  These events are collectively referred to as the Mòd Fringe.

To participants, the Mòd is also an opportunity to meet with old friends and make new ones.  The Mòd is popularly known as the "Whisky Olympics", considered "either a vicious slur or fair comment".

Media coverage
BBC Scotland has traditionally broadcast Mòd highlights on BBC One, BBC Two and Radio nan Gàidheal.  Since its introduction in 2008, BBC Alba has provided coverage in Gaelic.  Presenters have included traditional musician, Gaelic speaker and broadcaster, Mary Ann Kennedy and Gaelic broadcaster Cathy Crombie.

Past and future festivals
The Mòd is held each October, and has been held in the following locations throughout Scotland, both Highland and Lowland.

These are the host locations to date:

 Aberdeen - 1946, 1955, 1964, 1976
 Airdrie - 1993
 Aviemore - 1969
 Ayr - 1973
 Blairgowrie - 1996
 Dingwall - 1905, 1931, 1991
 Dundee - 1902, 1913, 1937, 1959, 1974
 Dunoon - 1930, 1950, 1968, 1994, 2000, 2006, 2012, 2018
 East Kilbride - 1975
 Edinburgh - 1899, 1910, 1919, 1928, 1935, 1951, 1960, 1986
 Falkirk - 2008
 Fort William - 1922, 1927, 1932, 1981, 1985, 1999
 Glasgow - 1895, 1901, 1907, 1911, 1921, 1933, 1938, 1948, 1958, 1967, 1988, 1990, 2019
 Golspie - 1977, 1995
 Greenock - 1904, 1925
 Inverness - 1897, 1903, 1912, 1923, 1936, 1949, 1957, 1966, 1972, 1984, 1997, 2014, 2021
 Largs - 1956, 1965, 2002
 Lochaber - 2007, 2017
 Motherwell - 1983
 Oban - 1892, 1893, 1894, 1898, 1906, 1920, 1926, 1934, 1953, 1962, 1970, 1978, 1992, 2003, 2009, 2015
 Paisley - 2013
 Perth - 1896, 1900, 1924, 1929, 1947, 1954, 1963, 1980, 2004, 2022
 Rothesay - 1908, 1952
 Skye - 1982
 Skye and Lochalsh - 1998
 Stirling - 1909, 1961, 1971, 1987
 Stornoway - 1979, 1989, 2001
 Thurso - 2010
 Western Isles - 2005, 2011, 2016

The next four Mòds have each been postponed by a year, due to the COVID-19 pandemic in Scotland:
 Inverness - 8–16 October 2021.
 Perth - 14–22 October 2022
 Paisley - 13–21 October 2023.
 Oban - October 2024

The southernmost host location is Ayr, the easternmost Aberdeen and the northernmost is Thurso. As can be seen from the list, certain locations are more favoured. Areas with large amounts of hall space and accommodation are favoured.

Some notable areas of Scotland that have never been visited by the Mòd include Arran, Islay (which has a significant Gaelic-speaking population), Dumfries and Galloway, Fife, Angus (outwith Dundee), most of North East Scotland, Loch Lomond-side etc.

The Mòd has never been to the Scottish Borders or the Northern Isles, but there is little connection between these areas and the Gaelic language.

Unlike the National Eisteddfod, the National Mòd has never been held in England.

See also 
 National Eisteddfod of Wales
 Oireachtas na Gaeilge
 List of Celtic festivals

References

External links 

 Royal National Mòd
 Royal National Mòd, Falkirk 10-18 October 2008

1892 establishments in Scotland
Scottish culture
Cultural festivals in the United Kingdom
Scottish Gaelic language
National Mod
Folk festivals in Scotland
Recurring events established in 1892
Cultural festivals in Scotland
Literary festivals in Scotland
Shinty
Celtic music festivals
Music festivals established in 1892
Events in Scotland
Autumn events in Scotland